Yana Uqhu (Quechua yana black, uqhu swamp, Hispanicized spelling Yanaojo) is a mountain in the Wansu mountain range in the Andes of Peru, about  high. It is situated in the Apurímac Region, Antabamba Province, Juan Espinoza Medrano District. Yana Uqhu lies southwest of the peaks of Quri Pawkara and south of Yuraq Qaqa.

References 

Mountains of Peru
Mountains of Apurímac Region